Eclactistis is a genus of moths of the family Oecophoridae.

There is only one species in this genus:
Eclactistis byrseuta  (Meyrick, 1913)  that is found in New Guinea This species has a wingspan of 14-15mm.

An Australian species Eclactistis anisopasta Turner 1935 that was described in this genus was transferred to ''Baioglossa.

References

www.nhm.ac.uk Genus Database

Oecophoridae
Monotypic moth genera
Taxa named by Edward Meyrick
Moths of Oceania